Javier Bello-Portu (Tolosa, 1920–2004) was a Basque composer. He was founder of the choir Escolanía Felipe Gorriti in 1943, for whom he composed the majority of his fifty choral works. Other works were composed for another choir he founded in the French Basque Country, the Basque Country Choir of Bayonne. His work was influenced by French impressionism and by the work of Father Donostia.

Works, editions and recording
 Pays Basque,
 Tres canciones nostálgicas,
 Un homenaje a Iparraguirre,
 Don Miguel de Unamuno: tres sonetos
 Tres canciones alegres,
 Tríptico vasco o Tres canciones sentimentales
 O vos omnes (1937)
 Miserere (1946)
 Ave Maria (1949)
 A mi flor (1947) by Federico de Zavala (1916–1993)
 A Belén - Pastores venid! (1942) two Christmas carols
 Lastozko zubiya (1946)
 Carta del Rey (1950)
 Llanto por Martín Zalacain de Urbía (1952) for the character in Pío Baroja's novel Zalacain the Adventurer
 Soule (1953) from the song "Adios ene maitia"
 Canción de invierno (1957) poems from La fuente pensativa by Juan Ramón Jiménez
 Berceuse de Reparacea (1957) lullaby of the Palace of Reparacea in Oieregi
 Iparraguirre (1954) two songs by José Maria Iparraguirre, Nere amak baleki and Agur Euskalerriari, which had already been adapted in Un Homenaje a Iparraguirre (earlier version for mixed voices)
 Eguerria! (1955)
 No lloréis, mis ojos (1975) verses from Shepherds of Bethlehem by Lope de Vega
 In memoriam of Garat-Anthon Ayestarán (1987)
 Don Miguel de Unamuno: Tres sonetos (1996)
 Dos Fábulas de Félix María Samaniego: Las moscas, La Serpiente y la Lima (1997).
 Donostiaco damachoac (1992)
 Ostiraletan duzu (1992)
 Plainte de la jeune châtelaine (1992)

Recordings
 Complete choral works I - KEA Vocal Group, dir. Enrique Azurza. NB013 2008
 Complete choral works II - KEA Vocal Group, dir. Enrique Azurza. NB019 2009

References

1920 births
2004 deaths
Basque classical composers
20th-century composers
Male composers
People from Tolosa, Spain
20th-century Spanish musicians
20th-century French male musicians
Spanish male musicians
Spanish emigrants to France